The Parliament of Canada is the legislative body of the government of Canada. The Parliament is composed of the House of Commons (lower house), the Senate (upper house), and the sovereign, represented by the governor general. Most major legislation originates from the House, as it is the only body that is directly elected. A new parliament begins after an election of the House of Commons and can sit for up to five years. The number of seats in parliament has varied as new provinces joined the country and as population distribution between the provinces changed; there are currently 338 House MPs and 105 Senators (when there are no vacancies).

Canada uses a Westminster-style parliamentary government, in which the leader of the party with the most seats in the House of Commons becomes Prime Minister, even if the leader is not an elected member of parliament. The leader of the party with the second-most seats in the House becomes the leader of the Official Opposition, and debate (formally called Oral Questions) between the parties is presided over by the speaker of the House. When the party with the most seats has less than half of the total number of seats, it forms a minority government, which can be voted out of power by the other parties. The Canadian Parliament is located at Parliament Hill in the capital city, Ottawa, Ontario.

Parliaments

Notes

References 

Recurring events established in 1867